Better with You is an American television sitcom created by Shana Goldberg-Meehan that aired on ABC from September 22, 2010, to May 11, 2011. It stars JoAnna Garcia Swisher, Jennifer Finnigan, Josh Cooke, Jake Lacy, Kurt Fuller, and Debra Jo Rupp.

On May 13, 2011, ABC cancelled the series after one season two days after the series finale aired.

Plot
The series revolved around three different relationships that are tightly intertwined in one family, as it follows a couple, Maddie and Ben, who had been dating for nine years and are happy just living together despite not taking the next step, marriage. Maddie's life is thrown for a loop when her younger sister Mia announces that she is pregnant and is about to marry Casey, a guy whom she has only known for seven weeks. To make matters worse, Maddie is stunned that their parents, who have been married for 35 years and have their issues, approve of the union, leaving Maddie and Ben questioning themselves about their own relationship. The story followed their lives and struggles.

Cast
 JoAnna Garcia Swisher as Mia Putney
 Jennifer Finnigan as Madeleine "Maddie" Putney
 Josh Cooke as Ben Coles
 Jake Lacy as Casey Marion Davenport
 Kurt Fuller as Joel Putney
 Debra Jo Rupp as Vicky Putney

Production
Better with You was previously known as Better Together, Couples, Leapfrog, and then briefly as That Couple. On January 15, 2010, ABC green-lit the pilot, which was written by Friends writer and executive producer Shana Goldberg-Meehan and directed by James Burrows. The show was produced by Bonanza Productions, Silver and Gold Productions, and Warner Bros. Television. Better with You aired on Wednesday at 8:30 after The Middle and before Modern Family. On October 26, ABC announced that Better with You was picked up for a full 22-episode season.

Ben Kweller wrote the theme song for the show. Country music singer Reba McEntire made an appearance in episode 8, "Better with Flirting", as wedding planner Lorraine Ashley. Series regular Joanna Garcia Swisher and McEntire both starred in the WB/CW series Reba.

Better with You marked the second time Josh Cooke and Jennifer Finnigan have co-starred on a sitcom, the first being the short-lived 2005 NBC series Committed; it is also the second time that Cooke and Kurt Fuller co-starred in a sitcom, having previously starred in the short-lived 2006 ABC series Big Day.

Episodes

International broadcasts

Reception

Critical reception
Better with You received generally positive reviews and had a Metacritic Metascore of 64.

Ratings

Awards and nominations

References

External links
 

2010s American romantic comedy television series
2010s American sitcoms
2010 American television series debuts
2011 American television series endings
American Broadcasting Company original programming
English-language television shows
Television series about couples
Television series about families
Television series by Warner Bros. Television Studios
Television shows set in New York City